James Andrew Little (born January 14, 1976, Woodbridge, Virginia) is an American carpenter, stagehand and television personality. He is currently a co-host and carpenter on HGTV's Don't Sweat It (with Steve Watson) and HGTV's Dear Genevieve (starring Genevieve Gorder).

Family
Little's father owned a construction company and his mother managed companies ranging from landscaping, lumber, painting and millwork. Little was formerly a carpenter on Trading Spaces and Town Haul. He belongs to the International Alliance of Theatrical Stage Employees (IATSE).

Television

HGTV
Don't Sweat It (91 episodes to date; co-host and construction supervisor)
Dear Genevieve (8 episodes to date)
25 Biggest Renovation Mistakes (1 episode; commentator) 
25 Biggest Landscaping Mistakes (1 episode; commentator)

TLC
Trading Spaces (13 Episodes, carpenter)
Town Haul (18 Episodes, carpenter and co-host)

References

External links
Official Site
Don't Sweat It Official Site

Trading Spaces Official Site

1976 births
Living people
American television personalities
American carpenters
People from Woodbridge, Virginia